is a Japanese footballer who plays for Tokyo Verdy on loan from Sagan Tosu.

Club statistics
Updated to 24 February 2019.

References

External links

Profile at Tokyo Verdy

1994 births
Living people
People from Kunitachi, Tokyo
Association football people from Tokyo Metropolis
Japanese footballers
J1 League players
J2 League players
Tokyo Verdy players
Sagan Tosu players
Renofa Yamaguchi FC players
Association football defenders